Samuel McLaughlin Parks Jr. (June 23, 1909 – April 7, 1997) was an American professional golfer, the winner of the U.S. Open in 1935, his only major  title.

Born in Bellevue, Pennsylvania, near Pittsburgh, Parks used his knowledge of the nearby Oakmont Country Club to win in June 1935 at age 25. Although a comparatively recent convert from college and amateur ranks and little-known nationally, Parks, the professional at the nearby South Hills Country Club, was the only player to negotiate Oakmont's furrowed bunkers and shaved greens in less than 300. After winning the U.S. Open, Parks played for the U.S. Ryder Cup team, matched against Alf Perry (the reigning British Open champion), the first time the U.S. Open champion would play the British Open Champion of the same year in the Ryder Cup Match. During that event, at the 36th hole, Parks made a  birdie putt to win the hole and tie the match, so that both he and the British champ remained undefeated in Ryder Cup play.

Parks, a University of Pittsburgh alumnus who helped found the school's golf team in the 1920s, died in 1997 at age 87 in Clearwater, Florida.

Professional wins (5)

PGA Tour wins (1)

Other wins (4)
this list may be incomplete
1937 Tri-State PGA Championship
1940 Pennsylvania Open Championship
1943 Tri-State PGA Championship
1945 Tri-State PGA Championship

Major championships

Wins (1)

Results timeline

Note: Parks never played in The Open Championship.

NYF = tournament not yet founded
NT = no tournament
CUT = missed the half-way cut
R64, R32, R16, QF, SF = round in which player lost in PGA Championship match play
"T" indicates a tie for a place

Summary

Most consecutive cuts made – 7 (twice)
Longest streak of top-10s – 2 (1935 U.S. Open – 1935 PGA)

References

External links

American male golfers
Pittsburgh Panthers men's golfers
PGA Tour golfers
Ryder Cup competitors for the United States
Winners of men's major golf championships
Golfers from Pennsylvania
People from Bellevue, Pennsylvania
1909 births
1997 deaths